Myriopteris newberryi, formerly Cheilanthes newberryi, is a species of lip fern known by the common name Newberry's lip fern. It is native to southern California and Baja California.

Description
Myriopteris newberryi has leaves up to about 30 centimeters long which are coated in matted white, gray, or brownish hairs. Each leaf is made up of subdivided segments where the ultimate segment is oval in shape, mostly flat, and hard to visualize due to its thick coat of hairs. On the underside are scattered sori containing sporangia. Each sporangium may have either 64 or 32 spores.

Range and Habitat
In Mexico, Myriopteris newberryi is found in extreme northwestern Baja California from Tecate south to Punta Colonet, and also on the Pacific island of Guadalupe, off the shore of Baja California. In California it is found mostly in the coastal mountains from the San Bernardino Mountains and south, and on San Clemente Island just offshore. It grows in rocky places in mostly dry habitat such as the California chaparral and woodlands.

Taxonomy
Based on plastid DNA sequence analysis, Myriopteris newberryi is a nearly basal member of Myriopteris clade C (covillei clade) and is relatively distantly related to other Myriopteris species.

References

Works cited

External links
Calflora Database: Myriopteris newberryi (Newberry's lip fern) — formerly Cheilanthes newberryi.
Jepson Manual eFlora (TJM2) treatment of  Myriopteris newberryi — formerly Cheilanthes newberryi.
USDA Plants Profile: Cheilanthes newberryi (Newberry's lip fern)
efloras.org: Flora of North America
UC Photos gallery — Cheilanthes newberryi

newberryi
Ferns of California
Ferns of Mexico
Flora of Baja California
Flora of Mexican Pacific Islands
Natural history of the California chaparral and woodlands
Natural history of the Channel Islands of California
Natural history of the Peninsular Ranges
Natural history of the Santa Monica Mountains